The 1980 Swiss Indoors, also known as the European Open Indoor Championships,  was a men's tennis tournament played on indoor hard courts that was part of the 1980 Volvo Grand Prix. It was the 11th edition of the tournament and was played in Basel, Switzerland from 13 October through 19 October 1980. Second-seeded Ivan Lendl won the singles title.

Finals

Singles
 Ivan Lendl defeated  Björn Borg 6–3, 6–2, 5–7, 0–6, 6–4
 It was Lendl's 4th singles title of the year and of his career.

Doubles
 Kevin Curren /  Steve Denton defeated  Bob Hewitt /  Frew McMillan 6–7, 6–4, 6–4

References

External links
 Official website

Swiss Indoors, 1980
Swiss Indoors
Indoor